{{DISPLAYTITLE:C4H6O4}}
The molecular formula C4H6O4 (molar mass: 118.09 g/mol) may refer to:

 Diacetyl peroxide
 Dimethyl oxalate
 Glycerol-1,2-carbonate
 Methylmalonic acid (MMA)
 Succinic acid

Molecular formulas